This is a list of listed buildings in Viborg Municipality, Denmark.

''Note:: This list is incomplete. A complete list og listed buildings in Vordingborg Municipality can be found on Danish Wikipedia.

The list

References

External links
 Danish Agency of Culture

 
Viborg